Desmond Patrick Bannon (19 April 1923 – 24 July 2000) was a rugby union player who represented Australia.

Bannon, a fly-half, was born in Haberfield, New South Wales and claimed 1 international rugby cap for Australia.

References

Published sources
 Howell, Max (2006) Born to Lead - Wallaby Test Captains (2005) Celebrity Books, New Zealand

Australian rugby union players
Australia international rugby union players
1923 births
2000 deaths
Rugby union players from Sydney
Rugby union fly-halves